Jewett is a village in Cumberland County, Illinois, United States. The population was 223 at the 2010 census. It is part of the Charleston–Mattoon Micropolitan Statistical Area.

Geography
Jewett is located in south-central Cumberland County at  (39.208458, -88.245157), along the route of the former National Road. U.S. Route 40 now runs through the northern part of the village, leading northeast  to Greenup and southwest  to Montrose. Interstate 70 passes to the north of the village, with access at Greenup and Montrose.

Demographics
As of the 2020 census there were 196 people, 103 households, and 90 families residing in the village. The racial makeup of the village was 94.90% White, 1.53% Native American, and 3.57% from two or more races. Hispanic or Latino of any race were 1.53% of the population.

There were 103 households, out of which 42.72% had children under the age of 18 living with them, 72.82% were married couples living together, 5.83% had a female householder with no husband present, and 12.62% were non-families. 12.62% of all households were made up of individuals, and 6.80% had someone living alone who was 65 years of age or older. The average household size was 2.63 and the average family size was 2.73.

The village's age distribution consisted of 18.9% under the age of 18, 5.7% from 18 to 24, 19.5% from 25 to 44, 31.3% from 45 to 64, and 24.6% who were 65 years of age or older. The median age was 52.0 years. For every 100 females, there were 82.5 males. For every 100 females age 18 and over, there were 96.6 males.

The median income for a household in the village was $48,393, and the median income for a family was $52,750. Males had a median income of $38,281 versus $14,063 for females. The per capita income for the village was $18,848. About 10.0% of families and 13.3% of the population were below the poverty line, including 15.7% of those under age 18 and none of those age 65 or over.

References

Villages in Cumberland County, Illinois
Villages in Illinois
Charleston–Mattoon, IL Micropolitan Statistical Area